The California Prison Moratorium Project is a grassroots organization co-founded by Dr. Ruth Gilmore, involved in Prison Abolition through Critical Resistance, and Ernesto Saveedra, a youth advocate, for the purpose of stopping "all public and private prison construction in California." Over its activist life, the CPMP has partnered with a number of groups including Critical Resistance, The California Coalition for Women Prisoners, Californians United for a Responsible Budget (CURB), and many other abolitionist organizations to move forward in their goal of halting any erection of additional penal facilities within the state of California. An example of their collective success is demonstrated in such cases as the 2001 prevention of a new Delano Prison where anti-prison activists such as the CPMP swayed public opinion away from yet another jail.

References

Prison reform
Prison abolition movement